Stephanie Allain is an American producer of independent movies in Hollywood, California.

Career
She began her film career in 1985 at Creative Artists Agency, first as a script reader, then as a staff reader. As a story analyst, she worked for 20th Century Fox, Warner Bros., and finally in 1989, at Columbia Pictures. There, Allain was one of twelve readers at the studio, and one of only two African-American readers. She rose through the ranks to become Senior Vice President of Production and was influential in encouraging and developing an African-American filmmaking community in Hollywood in the 1990s.

During her tenure at Columbia, Allain launched the careers of several young filmmakers including John Singleton, Robert Rodriguez and Darnell Martin. She personally pitched to Columbia's executives Singleton's Boyz n the Hood (1991). The controversial film would become a critical and commercial hit, garnering Singleton two Academy Award nominations. Among the films under her supervision were Poetic Justice (1993), I Like It Like That (1994), and The Craft (1996).

In 1996, Allain left Columbia Pictures to become President of Jim Henson Pictures. During her 4 years there, she produced Caroline Thompson's Buddy, as well as Henson brand movies, Muppets from Space and The Adventures of Elmo in Grouchland. After her stint at Henson, Allain joined 3Arts Entertainment, where she developed projects for clients and produced Reggie Rock Bythewood's Biker Boyz.

In 2003, Allain sold her house and founded Homegrown Films. Teaming with John Singleton, Craig Brewer's Hustle & Flow was produced. Hustle & Flow was sold to MTV/Paramount for a 9 million dollars and went on to win the Audience Award at Sundance in 2005, an Academy Award for Best Original Song and earned a Best Actor nomination for Terrence Howard.

In 2006, Allain and Homegrown Films produced another first time director, music video director, Sanaa Hamri's Something New, starring Sanaa Lathan and Simon Baker. She also worked again with producer John Singleton, partnering with Craig Brewer and his Southern Cross the Dog production company based at Paramount Pictures. Paramount Vantage released their latest film, Black Snake Moan, starring Samuel L. Jackson, Christina Ricci and Justin Timberlake on February 23, 2007.

She was the Festival Director for the LA Film Festival from 2011 to 2016. In 2021, he received a first look deal with Endeavor Content.

Filmography
She was a producer in all films unless otherwise noted.

Film

As an actress

Television

References

External links

American women film producers
Living people
African-American film producers
21st-century African-American people
21st-century African-American women
20th-century African-American people
20th-century African-American women